The women's canoe sprint K-4 500 metres at the 2016 Olympic Games in Rio de Janeiro took place between 19 and 20 August at Lagoa Stadium.

The medals were presented by Pál Schmitt, IOC member, Hungary and Cecilia Farias, Board Member of the ICF.

Competition format
The competition comprised heats, semifinals, and a final round.

Schedule
All times are Brasilia Time (UTC-03:00)

Results

Heats
The first boat from each heat qualified for the final, with the remainder going to the semi-finals.

Heat 1

Heat 2

Semifinals 
The top three boats qualified for the final.

Semifinal 1

Semifinal 2

Finals

Final B

Final A

References

Canoeing at the 2016 Summer Olympics
Women's events at the 2016 Summer Olympics